Combined Joint Task Force Paladin ("CJTF Paladin") was the International Security Assistance Force command responsible for counter-IED efforts and Explosive Ordnance Disposal (EOD) during the War in Afghanistan (2001–2021). With military and civilian personnel spread across the entire country, CJTF Paladin provided EOD Technicians, counter-IED trainers, intelligence personnel, and forensics labs to the ISAF Regional Commands.

CJTF Paladin was established in 2005 to focus Counter-IED efforts due to the rising trend of improvised explosive devices during the conflict. During the draw-down of troops and the end of the combat mission for NATO forces, CJTF Paladin was deactivated in December 2013, passing responsibility for all counter-IED operations to the ISAF Joint Command (IJC) Counter IED division.  Tactical operations continued to be tasked to the 242nd Ordnance Battalion (EOD) who were enhanced with additional EOD personnel and placed under the operational control of the IJC C-IED division.

Its counterpart in the Iraq War was Task Force Troy.

See also
 Participants in Operation Enduring Freedom
 Bomb disposal
 Improvised explosive device
 Joint Improvised Explosive Device Defeat Organization
 Counter-IED efforts
 Route clearance (IEDs)
 Resolute Support Mission
 Task Force Sparta

Notes

External links

 Official Facebook Page
 Task Force Paladin wages war against Afghan IEDs
 Official Media Page on DVIDS
 JIEDDO Training

International Security Assistance Force units and formations (Afghanistan)
Military units and formations established in 2005
Military units and formations disestablished in 2013
Improvised explosive devices
Bomb disposal
Joint task forces (armed forces)